Kunzang is a Tibetan name which usually means one which is good in all/good to all.  It may refer to
Kunzang (1445–c.1479), Tibetan prince
Kunzang Dekyong Wangmo (1892–1940), Tibetan Buddhist teacher
Kunzang Bhutia (born 1994), Indian football goalkeeper 
Kunzang Choden (born 1952), Bhutanese writer
Kunzang Choden (sport shooter) (born 1984), Bhutanese sports shooter 
Lenchu Kunzang (born 1992), Bhutanese sports shooter

See also
Kunzang Palyul Choling, a center for Buddhist study in Maryland, U.S.